Walter James Jones (January 16, 1926 – September 21, 2007) was a Bermudian sailor. He was born in Calgary, Alberta, Canada, and  competed at the 1960 Summer Olympics.

References

1926 births
2007 deaths
Canadian emigrants to Bermuda
Bermudian male sailors (sport)
Canadian male sailors (sport)
Olympic sailors of Bermuda
Sportspeople from Calgary
Sailors at the 1960 Summer Olympics – 5.5 Metre